Fort-Shevchenko is a military-base town and administrative centre of Tupkaragan District in Mangystau Region of Kazakhstan on the eastern shore of Caspian Sea. Primary industries include fishing and the extraction of stone. Population: 5,559 (2016 estimate).

History
The city was founded as a military stronghold by the Imperial Russian Navy in 1846 after nearby New Alexander Fort, built in 1834 overlooking Dead Kultuk, was deemed too remote. Until 1857, Fort Shevchenko was known as Novopetrovskoye (Новопетровское) and from 1857 to 1939 as Fort-Aleksandrovskii (Форт-Александровский). It was named for Ukrainian poet Taras Shevchenko, who was assigned to military service here during his exile. Today the town is used by the Kazakhstan Navy as a base.

The coat of arms of  Fort Alexandrovsky was approved October 22, 1908, along with other arms of the Transcaspian field: It is black and silver depicting the fortress and two fish.

Russian Civil War
Fort Alexandrovsky was the site of naval action on 21 May 1919, when a Squadron of the British Caspian Flotilla attacked the port.

Climate

Landmarks
There are several landmarks of significance; Shevchenko Memorial Museum, National History, and ethnographic museums. The Shevchenko Memorial Museum opened in 1932 near where he had been hiding. There are also some remnants of the fortress, a monument to Shevchenko and a state grave of Civil War heroes.

31 km from the city is the necropolis Beysenbay and up the coast the site Bautino (Баутино).

References

External links

Populated places in Mangystau Region
Transcaspian Oblast